Kānīgūram is a town in South Waziristan, Pakistan about 10 km south of the town of Ladha. Located within the heart of Mahsud land in Waziristan, Kaniguram is the principal place associated with the Ormur or Burki tribe. It was the hometown of the sixteenth-century Pashtun revolutionary leader and warrior-poet Bayazid Pir Roshan, who wrote the first known book of Pashto language.

According to the 2017 Census, Kaniguram is located in Ladha Tehsil of South Waziristan and has population of 13,809.

Today the locals in the town speak Ormuri as well as the Waziristani (Maseedwola) dialect of Pashto.

Demographics
This has been their tribe's focal point for over 800 years. Kaniguram has historically been off limits to outsiders except for the Burki and, more recently, the Mahsuds. Common store-front signs are "Burki knives" and "Burki pharmacy" and are indicative of the Burki's dominant position in Kaniguram despite being significantly outnumbered by Mahsuds. Relations between the Burki/Urmar and the Mahsuds are as complex as they are intimate. They are generally on good terms except for occasional skirmishes/war between the two. Despite living in an enclave within what has become Mahsud territory, the Urmar/Baraki/Burki have stubbornly retained their mother tongue/identity/traditions in Kaniguram. Kaniguram's layout is distinctive from other hamlets/settlements in the FATA in that the homes are adjacent or interconnected. Land in and around Kaniguram is exclusively in Burki, and to a lesser degree Mahsud, ownership or control.

Bayazid Pir Roshan, a Burki/Urmar, fought a major insurgency against the Mughal Emperor Akbar in the early sixteenth century. They are considered as the armory of the Mahsuds due to their small-arms cottage industry, which, however, does not rival Darra Adam Khel's. Kaniguram's daggers once rivaled those of Damascus.

Kaniguram is accessible from the north via the Razmak road and from the south from Wana on a narrow metalled road that is one of the few roads in South Waziristan. Access from this main "road" is limited to a suspension footbridge across a wide ravine that separates Kaniguram from the main road and is easy to guard, as behind it are mountains (Preghal and Jullundur) which limit access from the north. This footbridge has, more often than not, been unusable due to sabotage, damage etc. The people of this settlement often have to climb down the steep ravine from the road during harsh winter months and then climb back up to the Kaniguram side.

Many of Kaniguram's Burki spend winters in second homes in Dera Ismail Khan, where some work at the airport, or as traders. They are very involved in Pakistan's trucking and construction industries based primarily out of Karachi and are enterprising businessmen and traders.

Like other Pashtun tribes, the Burki seek self-segregation from the outside world: thus the importance of Kaniguram as the historical focal point of the tribe and the continued effort to retain their native tongue (Urmar), which predates Pushtu. Bayazid of the Urmars/Baraks became widely known as Pir Roshan or Rokhan, which in Pashto stands for "the Enlightened Sufi Master." He was the first local leader to lead a major insurgency against the Mughal Emperor Akbar.

Kaniguram's most famous resident was Bayazid Pir Roshan, whose descendants moved to Basti Baba Khel in the seventeenth century. Real name Bayazid, became known as Pir Roshan (the enlightened pir) and was an advocate for learning and equal treatment for women, a revolutionary concept for the times and even today in South Waziristan. From his base in Kaniguram, he started his insurgency movement, which was carried on by his children and then his grandchildren.

The major focus of the movement was to create equality between men and women, including the right to learn and listen to lectures of scholars and to fight against Akbar after his proclamation of Din-i-Ilahi.

Language and demographics

Ormuri and Pashto (Masidwola) are spoken in Kaniguram; today, all Ormuri-speakers are also bilingual in the local Pashto dialect of Maseedwola. Most can also converse in Urdu and some in English. Burki are still found in Baraki Barak in Logar and outside Ghazni, Afghanistan; however, Pashto and Dari have replaced Ormuri language there.

History
The exact origin of Baraki/Burki/Ormur tribe has been widely contested by multiple historians.

Captain (later Major) Robert Leech researched the Barki Barak (Logar) dialect of the Ormuri language. He said in 1838 that 

Henry Walter Bellew's book (1891) "An Enquiry into the Ethnography of Afghanistan", Bayazid's people — currently referred to as "Burki" but who until the early twentieth century were known as Barak or Baraki—were found in large numbers during the Greek period in their present environs (p. 62). On page 8 of this seminal work, Bellew refers to the Baraki's origins as "mysterious" but not of Arab/Ansari descent. On page 62, he writes of the Baraki: "After the time of the Greek dominion, the Baraki increased greatly in numbers and influence, and acquired extensive possessions towards the Hindu Kush in the north and the Suleman range in the south, and eastward as far as the Indus. During the reign of Mahmud Ghaznavi (2 November 971 – 30 April 1030), the Baraki were an important tribe, and largely aided the Sultan in his military expeditions. The reputation then acquired as soldiers they still retain, and the Afghan monarchs always entertain a bodyguard composed exclusively of Baraki. . . . In Afghanistan though their true origin is not suspected, the Baraki are a distinct people. The Baraki pretend descent from the Arab invaders, but this is a conceit of their conversion to Islam. They are a fine, tall and active people, with fairer complexions than the generality of Pashtuns, and are held in consideration as a respectable people. They have no place in the Pashtun genealogies by that name, being generally reckoned along with the Tajik population. Yet it is not altogether improbable that the present ruling tribe (Barakzai) of the Durrani/Abdali in Afghanistan and Pakistan is originally derived from the Baraki."

George Grierson has given a detailed account of the language in the "Memoirs of the Asiatic Society of Bengal" 1918 [9], along with history of the tribe and the language. This work has been revised by including more information on the subject and published in his well-Known "Linguistic Survey of India Vol. X" in 1921. According to him:

"Ormuri is a West Iranian language, and its nearest relatives are the dialects of western Persia and Kurdish. Another interesting point is that Ormuri, although a West Iranian language, contains manifest evidence of contact with the Dardic languages whose present habitat is the hill country south of the Hindu Kush. At the present day these languages are being gradually superseded by Pashto, and are dying out in the face of their more powerful neighbour. Those of the Swat and Indus Kohistans are disappearing before our eyes. There is reason to believe that this has been going on for several centuries. In historic times they were once spoken as far south as the Tirah valley, where now the only language heard is Pashto, and the fact that Ormuri shows traces of them leads to the supposition that there were once speakers of a Dardic languages still further south in Waziristan and, perhaps, the Logar country before they were occupied by the Pashtuns."

Notable people from Kaniguram

Bayazid Pir Roshan 1525–1585 Pushtun warrior and intellectual, founder Roshaniyya (Enlightenment) movement.
Descendants comprise the "Baba Khel" branch of the Burki Qaum (tribe).

Sport
Arshad Iqbal Burki – Current internationally ranked squash player
Feroze Khan (field hockey) September 1904-April 2005 (Burki) (Danishmand)- 1928 Amsterdam Olympics Gold Medal - British India Hockey Team
Mohammad Jahangir Khan, cricketer, a Cambridge Blue, (Baba Khel) (Majid Khan's Father) - British India (IND) Cricket Team (1930s)
Hamidullah Khan Burki (Baba Khel) -1948 Pakistan Olympic Hockey Team; Captained Pakistan Field Hockey Team 1950 Barcelona International Cup (joint winners) 
Majid Khan (Baba Khel), Pakistan Cricket Team. Played cricket (1964-1982).
Bazid Khan (Baba Khel), Pakistan Cricket (debut 2004). Majid Khan's son.

Recent books and research 
The invading armies in present Afghanistan and north west Pakistan seem to have paid significant attention to Kaniguram and the Barakis/Burkis. During the Soviet Invasion of Afghanistan, Saint Petersburg State University Institute of Oriental Studies seemed to have been the institution tasked to study the Roshaniyya movement, in order to understand their foe (see reference section below).

Following the 2002 invasion, some scholars into the field to study and understand this movement Sergei Andreyev, (Chief Joint Mission Analysis Center, United Nations), an Oxford academic was sent on UN assignment to Afghanistan, while at the same time he was funded by the Institute of Ismaili Studies to research and write a book on the movement.

See also
 Faqir of Ipi
 Burki
 Pir Roshan

References

Sources
The Rawshaniyya: Sufi movement in the Mughal tribal periphery, in Late Classical Sufism. (Curzon Persian Art & Culture) (Hardcover) Sergei Andreyev
Babur-Nama By Mughal Emperor Babur Translated by Annette Beveridge: Pg 527.530.544.589.594.598-601.638.673.679.692.681. Birki, Barak, Barakistan, Birkistan.
Olaf Caroe, The Pathans
Henry Walter Bellew, "An Enquiry into the Ethnography of Afghanistan," 1891.
Punjab Notes and Queries Volume II, Page 160 (History of Bayezid) Desiples of Sheikh Bazid – Pathans of Mastwi – Tirah (FYI)
Joseph von Hammer-Purgstall - Geschichte der Assassinen.
Dabistan of Mohsani Fani (Translated by Leyden, Volume 11 of the Asiatic Researches (Pages 406, 407, 420 (Ala Dad))
Captain Robert Leech - The Journal of the Asiatic Society of Bengalâ{(Vol. VII-1838), Part-I January to June, 1838}, About five pages from 727 to 731
Memoirs of the Saints, translated by Dr. Bankley Behari
Dr. Bellew on Barik/Baraki Pathans - An Inquiry into the Ethnography of Afghanistan by H.W. Bellew.

Religious factor in the traditional Pashtun warfare, in Proceedings of the International Conference on Weaponry and Warfare in Historical and Social Perspective, Hermitage Press, St Petersburg, 1998, pp. 55–59
Uwaysi Aspects in the Rawshani Doctrine, in Central Asia and the Eastern Hindukush. Countries and Peoples of the East journal, vol. XXXII, St Petersburg, 1998, pp. 137–148.
The Rawshaniyya; Millenarian Sufi Movement in the Mughal Tribal Periphery, in Persianate Sufism in the Safavid and Mughal Period. An International Conference on Late Classical Sufism, London 19–21 May 1997, Abstracts, pp. 7–8.
British Indian Views of the Later Followers of the Rawshaniyya, Nineteenth and Twentieth Centuries, in Iran, volume 22, London, 1994, pp. 135–138.
Turmoil on the Roof of the World, in Central Asia and the Caucuses in World Affairs, Hastings, 1993, pp. 1–5
Notes on the Ormur People, in St Petersburg Journal of Oriental Studies, vol. IV, St Petersburg, 1993, pp. 230–238.
On a Little-Known Rawshani Source, in: Man, Culture, Philosophy, The Urals University Press, Yekaterinburg, 1992, pp. 335–349 (In Russian).
Two Rawshani Sources on Five Pillars of Islam, in: St Petersburg Journal of Oriental Studies, vol. I, St Petersburg, 1992, pp. 380–384 (in Russian).
Aminullah Gandapur, "Tarikh-e-Sar Zamin-e-Gomal" (Urdu) History of the Gomal Land; National Book Foundation, Islamababd, 2008, P- 58-60; Quoting from sources like "Tuzk-e-jahangiri" (Emperor Jahangir) Notes (Raverty) 'Glossary of Tribes' (Sir Danzil Ibbeston, Edward Maclagan and H.A.Rose) and Imperial Gazetteer of India NWFP 1901.

Populated places in South Waziristan